Pashmina is the fine variant of spun cashmere wool.

Pashmina may also refer to:

 Pashmina (graphic novel), a 2017 novel by Nidhi Chanani
 Pashmina goat or changthani, the source of Pashmina wool
 Pashmina shawl, a popular garment and variant of the Kashmir shawl